Pergamino Aeroclub is a public use airport in the countryside  west of Pergamino, a city in the Buenos Aires Province of Argentina.

See also

Transport in Argentina
List of airports in Argentina

References

External links 
OpenStreetMap - Pergamino Aeroclub
OurAirports - Pergamino Aeroclub
WorldAeroData - Pergamino Airport

Airports in Argentina
Buenos Aires Province